Mukta Dutta Tomar (born 4 June 1961) is an Indian civil servant who belongs to the Indian Foreign Service cadre. She is the incumbent Indian Ambassador to Germany.

Personal life
Mukta Dutta Tomar graduated from the University of Calcutta. She is married to Ashok Tomar, who is an Indian Foreign Service officer of the 1978 batch.

Career
She joined the Indian Foreign Service in 1984. She has served in Indian missions at Madrid, Kathmandu, Paris and Yangon. She has served at the Permanent Mission of India to the United Nations at New York. She was India's Deputy High Commissioner to Bangladesh. She also functioned as the Consul General of India in Chicago from August 2010 to July 2013.

Mukta Dutta Tomar has also served as the Ministry of External Affairs in New Delhi in various Divisions such as the Americas Division and as Additional Secretary (Administration). She has also served as the Head of the Consular, Passport & Visa Division as well as the Investment, Technology Promotion & Economic Division.

References

Living people
Indian Foreign Service officers
Indian women ambassadors
University of Calcutta alumni
1961 births